The Miss Nicaragua 2003 pageant, was held on March 1, 2003 in Managua, after several weeks of events.  At the conclusion of the final night of competition, Claudia Salmerón from Tipitapa won the title. She represented Nicaragua at Miss Universe 2003 held in Panama later that year. The rest of the finalists would enter in different pageants.

Placements

Special awards

 Most Beautiful Face - Tipitapa - Claudia Salmerón
 Miss Congeniality - Leon - Karen Paola Galo
 Miss Photogenic - Jinotega - Nadia Martinez
 Best Hair - Jinotega - Nadia Martinez
 Miss Internet - Managua - Marynés Argüello (by votes of Miss Nicaragua Webpage)
 Miss Global Beauties - Nueva Segovia - Marisela Rodríguez (by votes of GB Webpage)

.

Official Contestants

Judges

 Ivania Navarro -  Miss Nicaragua 1976 & Miss Teenage Intercontinental 1976
 Piero P. Coen Ubilla - Executive President of Coen Group S.A
 Ausberto Narvaez - Adivisor of National Tourism Institute
 Henrique Fontes - Director of Global Beauties Webpage
 Tiffany Roberts - Journalist
 Edwin Rosario - Fashion Designer
 Julio Castillo - CEO of Supermercados Unidos S.A

.

Background Music

Opening Show –  Raúl Fuentes Cuenca - "Prohibida"
Swimsuit Competition - Can 7 - "Cruisin"
Evening Gown Competition – Safri Duo - "Samb-Adagio"

Special Guests

 Duo Guardabarranaco - "Dame tu Corazon"

.

References

Miss Nicaragua
2003 in Nicaragua
2003 beauty pageants